Anklet is an ornament worn around the ankle.

Anklet may also refer to:

 Anklet (sock)
 Operation Anklet
 Short gaiters